Baranqar (also Romanized as Bārānqār and Barānqār; also known as Yārān Qār) is a village in Kaghazkonan-e Shomali Rural District, Kaghazkonan District, Meyaneh County, East Azerbaijan Province, Iran. At the 2006 census, its population was 235, in 79 families.

References 

Populated places in Meyaneh County